The Scottish Church Collegiate School is a school in north Kolkata, West Bengal, India.

Notable alumni 
 Lalbehari De, Religious Leader and Writer.

 Turiyananda, Religious Leader.
 Dhan Gopal Mukerji, First successful Indian man of letters, Poet and Writer mainly for children and also for adults in english with international fame, won the John Newbery Medal.
 Akhil Niyogi  (Swapanburo), Poet, Writer and Editor.
 Berry Sarbadhikari, Journalist, Cricket Commentator and Writer.
 Manna De, the Sangeet Natak Akademi, the Padma Shree, the Padma Bhushan and the Dadasaheb Phalke Award winning Singer and Composer.
 Prabodhkumar Sanyal, Journalist and Writer.
 Badal Sarkar, the Sangeet Natak Akademi and the Padma Shree awarde Playwright, Theater Director and Actor.
 Moti Nandi, Journalist and the Sahitya Akademi awarde Writer.
 Ajit Kumar Panja, Politician.
 Bikash Sinha, the Padma Shree and the Padma Bhushan awarde Physicist.
 Sadhan Pande, Politician.
 Dulal Lahiri, Actor and Theater Director.
 Soumitra Mitra, Reciter, Actor and Theater Directror.
 Soumitra Dastidar, Journalist, Writer and Documentary Filmmaker.
Sujoy Shome, Journalist, Writer, Graphic Designer, Filmmaker, Actor, Social Activist and Editor & Art Director of the Fourth Generation of celebrated Bengali monthly Sandesh (magazine).
 Santanu Bandyopadhyay, Vocalist of the Bishnupur gharana at Indian classical music.
 Swapan K Saha, Physicist.
 Debasish Roy, Singer and Rabindrasangeet Guru.
 Subhasish Mukhopadhyay, Actor.
 Anindya Chattopadhyay, Lyricist, Composer, Singer, Journalist, Writer, Editor, Actor and Filmmaker.
 Shilajit Majumder, Lyricist, Composer, Singer and Actor.
 Surya Shekhar Ganguly,  Grandmaster (chess).
 Sayantan Das, Chess Player.
 Tanishk Bagchi, Lyricist, Composer and Singer.
 Padmanabha Dasgupta, Actor and Screenplay Writer.

See also
Scottish Church College, the twin institution of the school, also founded by Duff.
Education in India
List of schools in India
Education in West Bengal

References

External links
 

Church of North India schools
Schools in Colonial India
Boys' schools in India
Private schools in Kolkata
Christian schools in West Bengal
Primary schools in West Bengal
High schools and secondary schools in West Bengal
Educational institutions established in 1830
1830 establishments in India